Major (Retired) Saif Ullah Cheema,1949 son of Chudhary Mohammad. Din Cheema father to 7 kids, is a retired army officer from Infantry from Pakistan Army. He was elected as a member of the Provincial Assembly of the Punjab from than PP-106 and now PP-131 in 1993 from the Pakistan Peoples Party. He served as a Special Advisor to the Chief Minister of the Punjab. He was once again the Pakistan Peoples Party candidate in the 2008 elections from PP-131.

References

Living people
Pakistan Army officers
Pakistan People's Party politicians
Year of birth missing (living people)
Place of birth missing (living people)
Punjab MPAs 1993–1996